Danilo Lerio Jr. (born 15 November 1980) is a retired Filipino professional boxer. He competed in the men's light flyweight event at the 2000 Summer Olympics. He had a southpaw stance.

Leading to the 2000 Summer Olympics in Sydney Lerio was mentored by Cuban coach Raul Liranza. Lerio lost his first and only bout in the Olympics against Rafael Lozano of Spain. His coach was dismissed from his position due to ordering Lerio to mix it up with his opponent despite leading four points with 17 seconds left in the bout.

He later turned pro and was the last Filipino who competed in the Olympics to do until Mark Anthony Barriga in the mid-2010s. As a professional boxer, he and his younger brother Roberto were handled by Todd Makelim. In May 2008, Lerio's record stood at 14-2-1 with three knock-outs following his one round knockout of Matt Meredith in New South Wales, Australia. Danilo Lerio retired from boxing in 2012.

Lerio also has an elder brother named Arlan who also competed in the 2000 Summer Olympics

References

External links
 

1980 births
Living people
Filipino male boxers
Olympic boxers of the Philippines
Boxers at the 2000 Summer Olympics
People from Cotabato
Flyweight boxers